is the 1st compilation album by the Japanese girl idol group Berryz Kobo, released in Japan on January 14, 2009, on the record label Piccolo Town.

The CD appeared less than 2 months before Berryz Kobo's 5th anniversary.  It contained material selected from 18 singles and 6 albums the group had released so far. There's also one new track, "Otoko no Ko", which opens the album.

All songs on the compilation, except one ("Dschinghis Khan", which is a cover of the German band of the same name), are written and produced by Tsunku.

The album was released in two editions: regular (PKCP-5132) and limited (PKCP-5130/1). The Limited Edition came with a DVD containing bonus videos, while the first press of the Regular Edition had a bonus photo card sealed in.

The album debuted at number 4 in the Oricon Daily Albums Chart and eventually ranked 11th for the week.

"Madayade" is the only Berryz Kobo's hit that can't be found on any other their album to date.

Members 
 Saki Shimizu
 Momoko Tsugunaga
 Chinami Tokunaga
 Miyabi Natsuyaki
 Maasa Sudo
 Yurina Kumai
 Risako Sugaya 
 Maiha Ishimura (uncredited)

Track listing

Charts

References

External links 
  
  
 Limited Edition, profile on the Oricon website 
 Regular Edition, profile on the Oricon website 

Berryz Kobo albums
2009 greatest hits albums